Tia Chan (born 3 September 2002), also known by the Chinese name Chen Tiya, is a Canadian ice hockey goaltender and member of the Chinese national ice hockey team, currently playing college ice hockey with the UConn Huskies women's ice hockey program in the Hockey East (HEA) conference of the NCAA Division I. She previously played in the Zhenskaya Hockey League (ZhHL) with the KRS Vanke Rays.

Chan represented China in the women's ice hockey tournament at the 2022 Winter Olympics in Beijing.

Playing career 
Chan began playing ice hockey at age four, following her two brothers, James and Ryan, onto the ice. She settled into goaltending after her brothers regularly asked her to man the goal so they could practice shooting.

She got her start playing on boys' minor ice hockey teams in the Greater Toronto and Hamilton Area before moving to women's teams at the age of eight. Her junior career was played with the Burlington Junior Barracudas in the Provincial Women's Hockey League (PWHL).

NCAA 
Chan joined the UConn Huskies women's ice hockey program in the Hockey East (WHEA) conference of the NCAA Division I as an incoming freshman for the 2020–21 season. As a rookie, she started ten games and posted an excellent 1.49 goals against average (GAA) and .947 save percentage (SV%) on the season. Her stellar play was recognized with selection to the Hockey East All-Rookie Team.

Career statistics

Regular season and playoffs 

Sources:

International

References

External links
 
 

Living people
2002 births
Sportspeople from Hamilton, Ontario
Ice hockey people from Ontario
Canadian women's ice hockey goaltenders
Shenzhen KRS Vanke Rays players
UConn Huskies women's ice hockey players
Ice hockey players at the 2022 Winter Olympics
Olympic ice hockey players of China
Canadian sportspeople of Chinese descent
Canadian expatriate ice hockey players in China
Canadian expatriate ice hockey players in Russia
Canadian expatriate ice hockey players in the United States